Lee Ridley (born 5 December 1981) is an English professional footballer who plays as a left back for Winterton Rangers.

He has previously played for Scunthorpe United, Cheltenham Town, Darlington and Lincoln City, Grimsby Town, Gainsborough Trinity and Worksop Town.

Career

Scunthorpe United
Born in Scunthorpe, Lee started his career with Scunthorpe United as a young child and went on to make 117 appearances in all competitions scoring three goals between 2000 and 2007. Despite being offered a new 2-year contract by Scunthorpe after their promotion to the Championship in 2007, he opted to stay in League One.

Cheltenham Town
He joined Cheltenham Town signing a three-year deal at Whaddon Road. Possibly deciding that he will get a greater regularity of first team football after making only 20 appearances in his final year at Scunthorpe. On 22 November 2007 he joined Darlington on a one-month loan deal. He then joined Lincoln City on a one-month loan deal on 4 January 2008.

He was released by the club along with 7 other players in May 2010.

Grimsby Town
He signed a two-year contract with Grimsby Town on 24 June 2010 as a direct replacement for the departed Joe Widdowson. Ridley was the favoured left back at the club throughout his first season with the club, but during the 2011–12 season he lost his way in the side down to the signing of Jamie Green and coupled with several injury problems this would eventually see him have his contract mutually terminated on 25 November 2011.

Non-league
On 5 December 2011 he signed with Conference North side Gainsborough Trinity.

In November 2012, he joined Worksop Town on a one-month loan deal. The loan deal was extended to the end of the season however he returned to Trinity in February where after a weeks loan with Grantham Town he joined the club permanently. He joined Bottesford Town for the 2014–2015 season. Outside of his football career Lee now works at Scunthorpe United's charity arm, Scunthorpe United Community Sport & Education Trust, where he delivers the National Citizen Service alongside non-league player Alex Hipkins.

Honours
 Scunthorpe United Player of the season 2001, 2003

References

External links

Lee Ridley player profile at ctfc.com

1981 births
Living people
Sportspeople from Scunthorpe
English footballers
Association football defenders
Scunthorpe United F.C. players
Cheltenham Town F.C. players
Darlington F.C. players
Lincoln City F.C. players
Grimsby Town F.C. players
Gainsborough Trinity F.C. players
Worksop Town F.C. players
Grantham Town F.C. players
Bottesford Town F.C. players
Winterton Rangers F.C. players
English Football League players
National League (English football) players